John Thomas Ferguson (born December 21, 1941) is a Canadian real estate developer. He served as Chancellor of the University of Alberta from 2000 to 2004.

Ferguson attended the University of Alberta and earned a Bachelor of Commerce degree in 1964. He worked as a chartered accountant and for an oil and gas company as treasurer and vice president. He founded Princeton Developments Ltd in 1975, a real estate development firm and "world leader in  cold-weather climate property development". Ferguson was the Chairman of the University of Alberta Board of Governors from 1994 to 1997.

References

1941 births
Living people
Businesspeople from Edmonton
Canadian real estate businesspeople
Chancellors of the University of Alberta